Rabbit Makes a Monkey of Lion: A Swahili Tale is a 1989 children's picture book by Verna Aardema and illustrated by Jerry Pinkney. It is an adaption of a Swahili folktale and is about Rabbit tricking Lion over a calabash tree.

Reception
Publishers Weekly reviewed Rabbit Makes a Monkey of Lion writing "Aardema offers up a sound piece of storytelling, admirably reflected in Pinkney's full-color watercolor and pencil illustrations; he composes a lush jungle setting for the folksy antics, and brings drama to the text with his depictions of the various escapes from the hapless Lion." and the New York Times described Pinkney's illustrations as having "a velvety softness".

Rabbit Makes a Monkey of Lion has also been reviewed by the School Library Journal,  and Booklist.

See also

Br'er Rabbit

References

External links
Library holdings of Rabbit Makes a Monkey of Lion

1989 children's books
American children's books
American picture books
African folklore
English-language books
Works based on folklore
Books about rabbits and hares
Fictional tricksters
Books about birds
Books about mice and rats
Books about turtles
Books about lions
Africa in fiction
Jungles in fiction
Picture books by Jerry Pinkney
Dial Press books